Ali Asan-e Amiri, also known as Ali Ehasan, is a village in Iran

Ali Ehasan (or variants such as Ihsan, Ehsan and Ahsan) may refer to:

 Ahmed Ali (Fijian politician) (1938–2005),  Fijian academic and politician
 Ehsan Haddadi (born 1985), Iranian discus thrower
 Ehsan Elahi Zaheer (1945–1987), Pakistani Islamic theologian
 Sufi Barkat Ali (1911–1997), founder of Darul Ehsan 
 Ihsan Nuri (1883–1975), Kurdish soldier 
 Ihsan Abdel Quddous (1919–1990), Egyptian journalist, writer, novelist and poet 
 Joya Ahsan , Bangladeshi actress

See also
 Ehsan-ul-Haq Ehsan Danish (1914–1982), Urdu poet
 Cassius Marcellus Clay, Jr. Muhammad Ali (born in 1942), boxer
Ali (disambiguation)
Ehsan (disambiguation)